The Spice SE86C is a Group C2 and IMSA GTP Lights sports prototype race car, designed, developed, and built by British manufacturer, Spice Engineering, for sports car racing in the World Sportscar Championship and IMSA GT Championship, between 1986 and 1987.

References

Sports prototypes
Group C cars
IMSA GTP cars